Heriberto Aguayo Muñoz (born 24 July 1991) is a Mexican professional footballer who plays as a centre-back for Cancún.

External links

ascensomx.net

1991 births
Living people
Association football defenders
Tecos F.C. footballers
Mineros de Zacatecas players
C.F. Pachuca players
Dorados de Sinaloa footballers
Cafetaleros de Chiapas footballers
Liga MX players
Ascenso MX players
Liga Premier de México players
Tercera División de México players
Footballers from Jalisco
People from Zapopan, Jalisco
Mexican footballers